Gijsbertus Cornelis "Geert" den Ouden (born 24 July 1976) is a Dutch former professional footballer who played as a striker. While at Djurgårdens IF, he became the first-ever Dutchman to play in Allsvenskan and helped the team win the 2003 Allsvenskan and 2004 Svenska Cupen titles.

Career

Early career
Den Ouden has extensive experience playing in his native Netherlands, having made over 150 appearances for clubs such as SBV Excelsior and RBC Roosendaal since turning professional in 1998.

Djurgårdens IF 
Den Ouden was signed by Swedish club Djurgården in 2003, and played two seasons with the club, winning the Allsvenskan in 2003 and the Svenska Cupen in 2004. He was the first-ever Dutchman to play in Allsvenskan.

Return to the Netherlands 
He subsequently played for ADO Den Haag, Willem II, a second stint with Excelsior Rotterdam, and De Graafschap.

Valletta
Den Ouden made his debut for Valletta in the first qualifying round of the Europa League against Icelandic side Keflavik, scoring a goal in the 72nd minute, to round the match to a 3–0 win for the Maltese side. His Maltese Premier League debut arrived in the first league match of the season, scoring the opener in a 3–1 win over Birkirkara.

However, after half a year contract he left Valletta due to a disagreement with the coach. They agreed that his contract would be terminated. This was finalised on November 15, 2009.

Dayton Dutch Lions
In December 2009 den Ouden was approached by fellow Dutch professional Erik Tammer, who asked him to join the fledgling Dayton Dutch Lions team, which made its debut in the USL Premier Development League in 2010. Den Ouden agreed; he played his first game for the team on May 15, 2010, a 3-0 victory over the Cleveland Internationals in which he scored his team's third goal.

Honors 
Djurgårdens IF

 Allsvenskan: 2003
 Svenska Cupen: 2004

References

External links
  VI Profile

1976 births
Living people
Footballers from Delft
Association football forwards
Dutch footballers
Excelsior Rotterdam players
RBC Roosendaal players
Djurgårdens IF Fotboll players
ADO Den Haag players
Willem II (football club) players
De Graafschap players
Valletta F.C. players
Den Ouden, Geert
Eredivisie players
Eerste Divisie players
Allsvenskan players
Maltese Premier League players
Den Ouden, Geert
Dutch expatriate footballers
Expatriate footballers in Sweden
Dutch expatriate sportspeople in Sweden
Expatriate footballers in Malta
Dutch expatriate sportspeople in Malta
Expatriate soccer players in the United States
Dutch expatriate sportspeople in the United States